Lowell Mellett (1886 - 1960) was a journalist best known for supervising the series Why We Fight during World War 2.

Early life
Born in small-town Indiana, Mellett claimed his interest in public affairs came from holding a torch in rallies for rivals Grover Cleveland and Benjamin Harrison since, as he wrote, "a boy could keep the torch if he was thoughtful enough to drop out of the parade before it reached the finish line" He became a journalist, covering local and then national and international affairs, editing a paper in Seattle and then Washington DC for the Scripps-Howard Newspaper Chain. As editor at the Washington Daily News he clashed with the chain's management over FDR's court-packing plan; immediately upon his resignation in 1937, FDR telephoned him to recruit his services.
It wasn't until 1938 that Mellet took his first government job, as head of the National Emergency Council.

World War II
In 1939, Franklin Roosevelt appointed Mellett to head the Office of Government Reports, checking newspapers, polling the public and maintaining information officers throughout the country.

In 1942 this became the Office of War Information's Bureau of Motion Pictures (BMP).
FDR, in appointing Mellet to head the BMP, wrote “The American motion picture is one of the most effective mediums in informing and entertaining our citizens. The motion picture must remain free in so far as national security will permit. I want no censorship of the motion picture.” The BMP's most successful project was Why We Fight.

After the war, Lowell continued in journalism and published a number of books.  He died in April 1960.

Legacy

 There is an annual Lowell Mellett Award for Improving Journalism Through Critical Evaluation
 A discussion between Mellett and FDR, in 1940, was the first private Presidential conversation recorded on a tape system in Oval Office.

References

External links

Lowell Mellett Papers

1886 births
1960 deaths